Mahinda V was King of Anuradhapura in the 11th century. He was the last king of the Anuradhapura Kingdom as well as from the House of Lambakanna II. In 993, he fled to Ruhuna, the southern part of the country, when a Chola invasion led by Rajaraja Chola I captured Anuradhapura. He was later taken prisoner and taken to India, where he died as a prisoner in 1029. The Mahavamsa records that the rule of Mahinda V was weak and he was unable to even organize the collecting of taxes. The country was in a state of extreme poverty and his army refused to follow orders due to lack of wages.

See also
 List of Sri Lankan monarchs

References

External links
 Kings & Rulers of Sri Lanka
 Codrington's Short History of Ceylon

Monarchs of Anuradhapura
1029 deaths
Year of birth unknown
M
M
M
10th-century Sinhalese monarchs